Khvorzan (also Romanized as Khūrzan; also known as Khorzan, Khūr Zand, Khuwarzah, Khvārzeh, and Khvorzand) is a village in Ashna Khvor Rural District, in the Central District of Khomeyn County, Markazi Province, Iran. At the 2006 census, its population was 48, in 9 families.

References 

Populated places in Khomeyn County